was one of 23 escort destroyers of the Tachibana sub-class of the  built for the Imperial Japanese Navy during the final stages of World War II. The ship was completed in early 1945 and was sunk by a naval mine in June. Her wreck was salvaged in 1948 and subsequently scrapped.

Design and description
The Tachibana sub-class was a simplified version of the preceding  escort destroyers to make them even more suited for mass production. The ships had two Kampon geared steam turbines, each driving one propeller shaft, using steam provided by two Kampon water-tube boilers.

The main armament of the Tachibana sub-class consisted of three Type 89  dual-purpose guns in one twin-gun mount aft and one single mount forward of the superstructure. The single mount was partially protected against spray by a gun shield. The accuracy of the Type 89 guns was severely reduced against aircraft because no high-angle gunnery director was fitted. They carried a total of 25 Type 96  anti-aircraft guns in 4 triple and 13 single mounts. The Tachibanas were equipped with Type 13 early-warning and Type 22 surface-search radars. The ships were also armed with a single rotating quadruple mount amidships for  torpedoes. They could deliver their 60 depth charges via two stern rails and two throwers.

Construction and service 
Enoki (Nettle Tree) was ordered in Fiscal Year 1944 under the Wartime Naval Armaments Supplement Program and she was laid down at Maizuru Naval Arsenal on 14 October 1944. The ship was launched on 27 January 1945 and completed on 31 March. The destroyer was assigned to the 11th Destroyer Squadron of the Second Fleet the following day for working up. Enoki began training in the Seto Inland Sea on 8 April and continued to do so until 27 May. During this time, the squadron was reassigned to the Combined Fleet on 20 April.

On 26 June the ship's stern struck a naval mine which caused the aft magazine to explode, sinking the ship in shallow water at  near Obama, Fukui. The number of survivors is not known. Enoki was stricken from the navy list on 30 September. Her wreck was refloated on 1 July 1948 and subsequently broken up.

Notes

Bibliography

 
 

Tachibana-class destroyers
Ships built by Maizuru Naval Arsenal
1945 ships
World War II destroyers of Japan
Ships sunk by mines